The Mysterious Tale of How I Shouted "Wrong-Eyed Jesus" is an album by Jim White, released in 1997.

The album was the inspiration for the 2003 documentary film, Searching for the Wrong-Eyed Jesus.

Track list
"Book of Angels" – 4:55
"Burn the River Dry" – 5:00
"Still Waters" – 6:36
"When Jesus Gets a Brand New Name " – 5:17
"Sleepy-Town" – 5:38
"A Perfect Day to Chase Tornados" – 6:07
"Wordmule" – 4:28
"Stabbed in the Heart" – 4:26
"Angel-Land" – 5:26
"Heaven of My Heart" – 4:35
"The Road That Leads to Heaven" – 9:05

Personnel 
 Julia Albert – vocals, background vocals 
 Eddie Baytos – accordion
 Ralph Carney – clarinet, harmonica, musical saw, saxophone, slide clarinet, trombone
 Pam Corkey – background vocals
 Bill Elm – guitar, pedal steel
 Danny Frankel – drums, percussion
 Joe Henry – guitar, background vocals 
 James Kreig – background vocals 
 David Piltch – bass
 Paul Rabjohns – guitar, keyboards, percussion 
 Martin Tillman – cello
 Victoria Williams – vocals
 Jim White – vocals, banjo, guitar, keyboards, percussion slide guitar

In popular culture 
 The song "Still Waters" was prominently featured in an episode of British surrealist comedy program Blue Jam.
 "Wordmule" was notably featured in "Blood Money", the 55th episode of Breaking Bad.

References 

1997 albums
Jim White (musician) albums